This is a list of some notable mayors and all the later lord mayors of the city of Plymouth in the United Kingdom.

Plymouth had elected a mayor annually since 1439. The city was awarded the dignity of a lord mayoralty by letters patent dated 6 May 1935. The dignity was granted as part of the silver jubilee celebrations of George V. When the city became a non-metropolitan borough in 1974 the honour was confirmed by letters patent dated 1 April 1974.

Mayors of Plymouth

Source: https://new.plymouth.gov.uk/list-past-lord-mayors

Lord Mayors of Plymouth

References

Plymouth, Lord Mayors of the City of
 Mayor
History of Plymouth, Devon